The Serbian ethnographic series or Serbian Ethnographical Journal, known in Serbian as Srpski etnografski zbornik (СЕЗ, СЕЗб/SEZ, SEZb), is a peer reviewed academic journal published by the Serbian Academy of Sciences and Arts (SANU). It includes the subseries Naselja i poreklo stanovništva, formerly named Naselja srpskih zemalja.

References

Further reading

External links

Serbian-language journals
Ethnography journals
Annual journals
Publications established in 1894
1894 establishments in Serbia
Serbian Academy of Sciences and Arts